

Legislative Assembly elections

Assam

Andhra Pradesh

Bihar

Goa, Daman & Diu

|- align=center
!style="background-color:#E9E9E9" class="unsortable"|
!style="background-color:#E9E9E9" align=center|Political Party
!style="background-color:#E9E9E9" |Seats contested
!style="background-color:#E9E9E9" |Seats won
!style="background-color:#E9E9E9" |Number of Votes
!style="background-color:#E9E9E9" |% of Votes
!style="background-color:#E9E9E9" |Seat change
|-
| 
|align="left"|Maharashtrawadi Gomantak Party||23||18||116,855||38.30%|| 2
|-
|
|align="left"|United Goans Party (Superia Group)||26||10||99,156||32.50%|| 2
|-
| 
|align="left"|Indian National Congress||19||1||41,612||13.64%|| 1
|-
| 
|align="left"|Independents||36||1||28,874||9.64%|| 1
|-
|
|align="left"|Total||138||30||305,077||
|-
|}

Gujarat

Haryana

Himachal Pradesh

Jammu and Kashmir

Madhya Pradesh

Maharashtra

Manipur

Meghalaya

Mizoram

Mysore

Punjab

Rajasthan

Tripura

West Bengal

References

External links

 Election Commission of India

1972 elections in India
India
1972 in India
Elections in India by year